Pesenka (literally song in Russian) may refer to:

"Pesenka" sometimes known as "Pesenka (La La La)", a song by the Russian pop–dance–techno group Ruki Vverh! subject of many covers and adaptations
"Pesenka", alternative title of "Pesnyu pro zaytsa (Song About a Bunny)", a song by Belarusian band Galasy ZMesta rejected for presenting Belarus in Eurovision Song Contest 2021
"Pesenka o medvedyakh", a song used in soundtrack for the 1966 Soviet film Kidnapping, Caucasian Style